The five counties of Hawaii on the Hawaiian Islands enjoy somewhat greater status than many counties on the United States mainland. Counties in Hawaii are the only legally constituted government bodies below that of the state. No formal level of government (such as city governments) exists below that of the county in Hawaii.

Unlike the other 49 states, Hawaii does not delegate educational responsibility to local school boards; public education is carried out by the Hawaii State Department of Education. Hawaiian counties collect property taxes and user fees in order to support road maintenance, community activities, parks (including life guards at beach parks), garbage collection, police (the state police force, called the Hawaii Department of Public Safety, is limited in scope), ambulance, and fire suppression services.

All the counties were created in 1905 from unorganized territory, seven years after the Territory of Hawaii was created. The county of Kalawao was historically exclusively used as a leper colony, and does not have many of the elected officials the other counties do. Many services for Kalawao County are provided by Maui County. For example, the web site for the office of the Maui County Clerk says "The office is also responsible for the elections in the County of Maui and the County of Kalawao".

County information
The Federal Information Processing Standard (FIPS) code, which is used by the United States government to uniquely identify counties, is provided with each entry. The FIPS code for each county links to census data for that county.

|}

References

 
Counties
Hawaii